Laura Grace DeMarco is a professor of mathematics at Harvard University, whose research concerns dynamical systems and complex analysis.

Career 
DeMarco received her Ph.D. from Harvard University in 2002 under the supervision of Curtis T. McMullen. She held an NSF Postdoctoral Fellowship and was an L. E. Dickson Instructor at the University of Chicago from September 2002 to August 2005. She was also an assistant professor at the University of Chicago, and then she moved to the University of Illinois at Chicago, where she was tenured and promoted to professor. She moved to Northwestern University in 2014, and was promoted to Henry S. Noyes Professor of Mathematics in 2019, before she moved to Harvard University in 2020.

DeMarco is an organizer of GROW (Graduate Research Opportunities for Women) undergraduate conference.

Awards and honors 
In 2013, DeMarco became a fellow of the American Mathematical Society in the inaugural class of fellows. In 2017, she received the AMS Ruth Lyttle Satter Prize in Mathematics in Mathematics for her contributions to complex dynamics, potential theory, and the emerging field of arithmetic dynamics. In 2020, DeMarco was elected a member of the National Academy of Sciences.

She was an invited speaker at the 2018 International Congress of Mathematicians, speaking in the section on Dynamical Systems and Ordinary Differential Equations. She is the 2023 AWM-AMS Emmy Noether Lecturer in recognition of her "fundamental and influential contributions to complex dynamics, arithmetic dynamics, and arithmetic geometry."

Her work with Holly Krieger and Hexi Ye, "Uniform Manin–Mumford for a family of genus 2 curves", published in the Annals of Mathematics, won the 2020 Alexanderson Award of the American Institute of Mathematics.

Further reading

References

Year of birth missing (living people)
Living people
Women mathematicians
Dynamical systems theorists
Fellows of the American Mathematical Society
Harvard University alumni
American women mathematicians
Northwestern University faculty
University of Chicago faculty
University of Illinois Chicago faculty
Members of the United States National Academy of Sciences
Harvard University faculty
21st-century American women